Strout is a surname. Notable people with the surname include:

Anton Strout (born 1970), American writer
Cushing Strout, American historian
Elizabeth Strout (born 1956), American writer
Flora E. Strout (1867-1962), American teacher, social reformer
Richard Strout (1898–1990), American journalist

See also
Frederick Strouts (1834–1919), New Zealand architect